Zemono is a small settlement in the Vipava Valley north of the town of Vipava in the Littoral region of Slovenia.

Zemono Manor

The Zemono Manor, built on a small hill above the settlement, is a 17th-century manor house. Unusually for the area, it is built in the Palladian style with a rectangular floor plan. The renovated building is surrounded by a park and vineyards.

References

External links

Zemono at Geopedia

Populated places in the Municipality of Vipava